Chang Ruo was the ancestor of the Shang dynasty. His family name is Zi. He was the fourth leader of the Shang tribe.

History 
His great-grandfather was Xie. His grandfather was Zhao Ming. His father was Xiang Tu. His son was Cao Yu, the founding monarch of the Tang ancestors.

In order to domesticate horses, his father, Xiang Tu, was in the position of Xiang of Xia, and the horse was made.

After the death of Xiang Tu, Chang Ruo succeeded him. When he died, his son, Cao Yu, succeeded him, but because the name of Chang Ruo appears later, it may be a fictitious one.

Family 
Great-great-grandfather: Emperor Ku
Great-grandfather: Xie
Grandfather: Zhao Ming
Father: Xiang Tu
Self: Chang Ruo
Son: Cao Yu

Bibliography 
"Records of the Grand Historian" (史記)/Volume 3

Notes 

Shang dynasty kings